Franklin Cady Quinn  (August 24, 1876 – February 2, 1920), was a professional baseball player who played outfield in the Major Leagues for the 1899 Chicago Orphans of the National League.

Sources
 Baseball Reference

Chicago Orphans players
Baseball players from Pennsylvania
Major League Baseball outfielders
1876 births
1920 deaths
People from Warren County, Pennsylvania
19th-century baseball players
Port Huron Tigers players
Mansfield Haymakers players
Henderson Hens players